Ayllusuchus is an extinct genus of sebecid mesoeucrocodylian. Fossils have been found in the Lumbrera Formation of Argentina (Eocene age, Casamayoran).

References 

Sebecids
Eocene crocodylomorphs
Eocene reptiles of South America
Casamayoran
Paleogene Argentina
Fossils of Argentina
Salta Basin
Fossil taxa described in 1984
Prehistoric pseudosuchian genera